Gerald Fitzgibbon Brunskill (1866–1918) was an Irish Unionist Party politician who served briefly as Member of Parliament (MP) for Mid Tyrone. He was elected in the general election of January 1910, but lost the seat 11 months later in the December 1910 general election to Richard McGhee.

References

External links 

1866 births
1918 deaths
Members of the Parliament of the United Kingdom for County Tyrone constituencies (1801–1922)
UK MPs 1910
Irish Unionist Party MPs